Myriam Ben Salah (born 1985) is a Tunisian writer and curator based in Paris.

She became the editor-in-chief of Kaleidoscope Magazine in 2016. Prior, she coordinated special projects and public programs at the Palais de Tokyo from 2009 to 2016.

In 2017, Ben Salah curated I Heard You Laughing at the Gregor Staiger Gallery. She was the curator of the 10th edition of the Abraaj Group Art Prize. Ben Salah curated a collection called The Pain of Others at the Ghebaly Gallery in Los Angeles in 2018. She also edits the magazine F.A.Q.

In April 2020, it was announced that Ben Salah would become the next executive director and chief curator of the Renaissance Society at the University of Chicago.

References 

Women magazine editors
Tunisian curators
Tunisian editors
Tunisian women editors
1985 births
Living people
Tunisian women curators
Tunisian expatriates in France